Pedro Pablo Hernández (born 24 October 1986) is an Argentine-born Chilean professional footballer who plays for Chilean club O'Higgins as a midfielder.

Club career

Argentina and Uruguay
Born in Tucumán, Hernández moved to Buenos Aires at early age, and subsequently joined Racing Club's youth setup. He was released in 2005, aged 19, and returned to his hometown. After failing in a trial at San Martín de Tucumán, Hernández moved to Atlético Tucumán. He made his senior debuts in 2006, and moved abroad two years later, joining Racing Montevideo.

On 7 August 2009 Hernández moved to Defensor Sporting. He made his debut on the 23rd, starting in a 5–1 home routing over Atenas de San Carlos, and scored his first goal roughly a month later, netting the last of a 4–0 win at Central Español.

Major League Soccer
On 1 July 2010, D.C. United officially announced the loan signing of Hernández from Uruguayan club Defensor Sporting, after he trialed with the club. Despite being a regular starter for DC United, he rescinded his link on 7 January of the following year, and moved to Argentinos Juniors late in the month.

O'Higgins

In July 2013 Hernández joined O'Higgins, as a replacement for Universidad de Chile-bound Juan Rodrigo Rojas. He was a part of the side which won the campaign's Apertura tournament, scoring seven goals in 18 matches, including the historical goal in the final against Universidad Católica.

Hernández appeared with the side in 2014 Copa Libertadores, appearing in all matches as his side were knocked out in the group stages.

Celta de Vigo

On 26 June 2014, Hernández moved teams and countries again, after agreeing to a four-year deal with La Liga side Celta de Vigo, for an € 1.6 million fee. He made his debut for the club on 30 August, replacing Nolito in the 85th minute of a 1–1 away draw against Córdoba CF.

Hernández scored his first goal in the main category of Spanish football on 20 September, netting the first of a 2–2 away draw against Atlético Madrid.

Independiente

On 4 July 2018, Hernández returned to his natal Argentina and signed with Club Atlético Independiente.

International career

Eligibility

Since Hernández has Chilean Citizenship through Jus sanguinis principles in December 2013, he is eligible to play for Chile. Hernández was born in Argentina and is an Argentine citizen; he thus had the choice of either playing for Chile or Argentina.

When asked about his choice in a 2013 interview, he stated:

Chile call-up

He then was called up by Jorge Sampaoli to represent his new country's main squad in a friendly against Costa Rica. He made his international debut on 22 January 2014, scoring the second and third in a 4–0 win at the Estadio Municipal Francisco Sánchez Rumoroso.

In June 2014, Hernández was called up to the provisional 30-men squad for the World Cup in Brazil, however an injury ruled him out of the final squad. He was re-called to play in the friendly match against Bolivia on 14 October 2014, where he was victim of a penalty that Arturo Vidal changed for goal and the final 2–2. In November, he was called to play against Venezuela and Uruguay, Hernandez scored the fifth goal in the 5–0 win against Venezuela in Talcahuano.

International goals
Scores and results list Chile's goal tally first.

Career statistics

Club

Honours

Club
Atlético Tucumán
Torneo Argentino A: 2007–08
O'Higgins
Primera División: Apertura 2013–14
Supercopa de Chile: 2014
Independiente
 Suruga Bank Championship: 2018

International
Chile
Copa América Centenario: 2016
FIFA Confederations Cup: Runner-up 2017

Individual
O'Higgins
Medalla Santa Cruz de Triana: 2014

Celta Vigo
UEFA Europa League Squad of the Season: 2016–17

References

External links

1986 births
Living people
Sportspeople from Tucumán Province
Chilean footballers
Chile international footballers
Argentine footballers
Argentine sportspeople of Chilean descent
Argentine emigrants to Chile
Citizens of Chile through descent
Association football midfielders
Atlético Tucumán footballers
Argentinos Juniors footballers
Racing Club de Montevideo players
Argentine Primera División players
Defensor Sporting players
Uruguayan Primera División players
D.C. United players
Major League Soccer players
O'Higgins F.C. footballers
RC Celta de Vigo players
La Liga players
Argentine expatriate footballers
Chilean expatriate footballers
Club Atlético Independiente footballers
Expatriate footballers in Argentina
Expatriate footballers in Chile
Chilean expatriate sportspeople in Uruguay
Expatriate footballers in Uruguay
Chilean expatriate sportspeople in the United States
Expatriate soccer players in the United States
Chilean expatriate sportspeople in Spain
Expatriate footballers in Spain
Copa América Centenario players
2017 FIFA Confederations Cup players
2019 Copa América players
Copa América-winning players